Valea Borcutului may refer to several places in Romania:

Valea Borcutului, a village in Sângeorz-Băi town, Bistriţa-Năsăud County
Valea Borcutului, a village in Baia Mare city, Maramureș County

See also 
 Borcut River (disambiguation)
 Borcutul River (disambiguation)

 Valea (disambiguation)